Gangauli halt (GNGL) is a passenger rail halt. The station falls under the administration of Varanasi division,  North Eastern Railway zone.

References

Railway stations in Jaunpur district
Railway Stations in Kerakat Sub District
Railway stations opened in 1904
1904 establishments in India
Varanasi railway division